Murder Without Cause is a 1921 German silent crime film directed by E. A. Dupont and starring Hermann Vallentin, Paul Richter and Hanni Weisse.

The film's sets were designed by the art directors Robert A. Dietrich and Jack Winter.

Cast
Hermann Vallentin as Mr. Powell, Chef der Zeitung 'Die Menschheit'
Paul Richter as Editor Murphy
Hanni Weisse as Alice
Henry Bender as Doctor Kent
Peter Esser
Bernhard Goetzke
Charles Puffy as Bill
Magda Madeleine as Florence Gatty
Fritz Schulz as Bobby Stanley

See also
The Man Who Dared (1946)
Beyond a Reasonable Doubt (1956)
The Life of David Gale (2003)

References

External links

Films of the Weimar Republic
German silent feature films
Films directed by E. A. Dupont
German black-and-white films
1921 crime films
German crime films
Films set in the United States
Films about journalists
Films about capital punishment
UFA GmbH films
1920s German films